Pine Valley was a borough in Camden County, in the U.S. state of New Jersey. As of the 2020 United States census, the borough's population was 21, an increase of 9 (+75.0%) from the 2010 census count of 12, which in turn reflected a decline of 8 (-40.0%) from the 20 counted in the 2000 census. As of the 2010 Census, Pine Valley was the second-smallest municipality by population in New Jersey, with seven more residents than the five residing in Tavistock, also in Camden County.

Pine Valley encompassed Pine Valley Golf Club, which regularly ranks highly on Golf Digest's list of America's 100 greatest courses.

The Borough of Pine Valley was created on April 23, 1929, from Clementon Township, one of seven municipalities created from the now-defunct township, and one of five new municipalities (including Hi-Nella Borough, Lindenwold Borough, Pine Hill Borough and Somerdale Borough) created on that same date.

In 2021, the Borough finalized plans to merge with the adjacent Borough of Pine Hill, dissolving the Pine Valley borough government completely by the end of 2021. Pine Hill gained $20 million in taxable property and the famed golf club.  The merger was completed January 1, 2022.

Geography
According to the United States Census Bureau, the borough had a total area of 0.97 square miles (2.51 km2), including 0.96 square miles (2.47 km2) of land and 0.02 square miles (0.04 km2) of water (1.55%).

The borough bordered the Camden County municipalities of Clementon Borough and Pine Hill.

Demographics

2010 census

As of the 2010 Census, the borough had the second smallest population in the state, ahead of only Tavistock, which had a population of five.

2000 census
As of the 2000 United States census there were 20 people, 8 households, and 7 families residing in the borough. The population density was 21.0 people per square mile (8.1/km2). There were 21 housing units at an average density of 22.1 per square mile (8.5/km2). The racial makeup of the borough was 100.00% White.

As of the 2000 Census, the borough was one of four municipalities with fewer than 50 residents among the 566 in the state, and its population of 20 was behind only Teterboro, where census officials counted 18 residents.

There were eight households, out of which 25.0% had children under the age of eighteen living with them, 87.5% were married couples living together, and 12.5% were non-families. 12.5% of all households were made up of individuals, and 12.5% had someone living alone who was 65 years of age or older. The average household size was 2.50 and the average family size was 2.71.

In the borough the population was spread out, with 25.0% under the age of 18, 20.0% from 25 to 44, 15.0% from 45 to 64, and 40.0% who were 65 years of age or older. The median age was 58 years. For every 100 females, there were 150.0 males. For every 100 women age 18 and over, there were 114.3 men.

The median income for a household in the borough was $31,875, and the median income for a family was $65,625. Men had a median income of $36,250 versus $52,500 for women. The per capita income for the borough was $23,981. None of the population and none of the families were below the poverty line.

Government

Local government
Pine Valley operated under the Walsh Act form of New Jersey municipal government. The borough was one of 30 municipalities (of the then-565) statewide that used the commission form of government. The governing body was comprised of three commissioners, who are elected at-large on a non-partisan basis to four-year terms of office in elections held as part of the May municipal elections. Each commissioner was assigned a specific department to head in addition to their legislative functions and one of the three commissioners was chosen to serve as mayor. Pine Valley has been governed under the Walsh Act, by a three-member commission, since 1942.

At the time of the borough's dissolution in 2022, the members of the Pine Valley Board of Commissioners were Mayor Michael B. Kennedy, Kendra L. Clark and Debra M. Kennedy all serving terms of office ending May 17, 2022. The three commissioners had run unopposed in the 2018 May municipal election.

The three incumbents—Jane Bromley and husband-and-wife Michael B. Kennedy and Deborah Kennedy—were re-elected in May 2014 to four-year terms of office in an election held entirely by mail to minimize the costs associated with establishing a polling place for the borough's 14 voters.

Federal, state and county representation
Pine Valley was located in the 1st Congressional District and was part of New Jersey's 8th state legislative district. Prior to the 2011 reapportionment following the 2010 Census, Pine Valley had been in the 6th state legislative district.

Politics
As of March 2011, there were a total of fifteen registered voters in Pine Valley, of which three (20.0%) were registered as Democrats, ten (66.7%) as Republicans and two (13.3%) as Unaffiliated. There were no voters registered to other parties.

In the 2013 gubernatorial election, Republican Chris Christie received 100.0% of the vote (nine cast), ahead of Democrat Barbara Buono and other candidates who received no votes, among the nine ballots cast by the borough's thirteen registered voters, for a turnout of 69.2%. In the 2009 gubernatorial election, Republican Chris Christie received 72.7% of the vote (8 ballots cast), ahead of both Independent Chris Daggett with 18.2% (two votes) and Democrat Jon Corzine with no votes, with eleven ballots cast among the borough's fourteen registered voters, yielding a 78.6% turnout.

Education
Pine Valley had a non-operating school district. Public school students from Pine Valley attend the Haddonfield Public Schools for pre-kindergarten through twelfth grade as part of a sending/receiving relationship, together with students from Haddonfield and Tavistock. As of the 2018–19 school year, the district, comprised of five schools, had an enrollment of 2,749 students and 215.2 classroom teachers (on an FTE basis), for a student–teacher ratio of 12.8:1. Schools in the district (with 2018–19 enrollment data from the National Center for Education Statistics) are 
Central Elementary School with 419 students in grades K-5, 
Elizabeth Haddon Elementary School with 367 students in grades K-5,
J. Fithian Tatem Elementary School with 422 students in grades PreK-5, 
Haddonfield Middle School with 659 students in grades 6-8 and 
Haddonfield Memorial High School with 869 students in grades 9–12.

Transportation

All roads in Pine Valley are privately maintained by the golf course. There is only one public entrance, via Atlantic Avenue from neighboring Pine Hill.

References

External links

 
1929 establishments in New Jersey
Boroughs in Camden County, New Jersey
New Jersey District Factor Group none
Populated places established in 1929
Walsh Act